Landweber is a surname. Notable people with the surname include:

 Lawrence Landweber, American computer scientist
 Laura Landweber, American evolutionary biologist
 Louis Landweber (1912 – 1998), American ship hydrodynamicist
 Landweber iteration in numerical mathematics
 Peter Landweber (born 1940), American mathematician working in algebraic topology